Metallon may refer to:
Metallon (Crete), a town of ancient Crete, Greece
Metallon Corporation, a gold mining company